Francis Staresmore (1578 - 1626) was an English politician who sat in the House of Commons in 1626.

Staresmore was the son of Sabine Staresmore, of Frolesworth, Leicestershire. He matriculated at Queen's College, Oxford on 14 October 1596 aged 17.  In 1626, he was elected Member of Parliament for Leicestershire and died later in the same year.

References

1578 births
1626 deaths
English MPs 1626
Alumni of The Queen's College, Oxford
Members of the Parliament of England for Leicestershire